Martha Crago  is the Vice-Principal of Research and Innovation at McGill University. She is an internationally known expert on language acquisition, specializing in studying language acquisition across languages and learner groups.  Crago received a B.A. in sociology and anthropology from McGill University in 1968 and a Ph.D. in communication sciences and disorders from McGill in 1988.  She was employed at McGill from 1971 to 2005 and the University of Montreal from 2005 to 2007. She was the Vice-President of Research at Dalhousie University from 2007 until accepting her current position. She has also served as a visiting professor at the Max Planck Institute for Psycholinguistics from 2005 to 2006.  She was appointed as a Member of the Order of Canada in December 2017.

Publications
 Evaluation of Minority-Language Children by Native Speakers, 1985
 Cultural context in communicative interaction of Inuit children, 1988
 Who Speaks What Language and Why? Language Use of Families in an Inuit Community, 1996

References

Sources

External links
Martha Crago's Homepage
Brief Biography - IASCL

Canadian women anthropologists
Canadian women sociologists
Canadian sociologists
Living people
Linguists from Canada
McGill University alumni
Academic staff of McGill University
Academic staff of the Dalhousie University
Women linguists
Members of the Order of Canada
Year of birth missing (living people)